Carlos Medinaceli (1899-1949) was a Bolivian writer and intellectual. His 1947 novel  La chaskañawi (la de los ojos de estrella) deals with sexual entanglements between "cholas" and Criollo people.

References 

Bolivian male writers
People from Sucre
1899 births
1949 deaths